Kamp-Bornhofen is a municipality in the district of Rhein-Lahn, in Rhineland-Palatinate, in western Germany.
Sights in Kamp-Bornhofen include the well known castle Liebenstein.

References

External links

Painting of Bornhofen, J.F. Dielmann, A. Fay, J. Becker (painter): F.C. Vogels Panorama des Rheins, Bilder des rechten und linken Rheinufers, Lithographische Anstalt F.C. Vogel, Frankfurt 1833
Painting of Camp 1, dito
Painting of Camp 2, dito
Painting of Camp 3, dito

Municipalities in Rhineland-Palatinate
Rhein-Lahn-Kreis
Middle Rhine